Shoeless Joe's is a sports-themed restaurant chain located in Ontario, Canada. The chain was founded in Toronto, ON in 1985. They specialize in chicken wings, but have a wide range of items on their menu. They are also known for their large complex of sports entertainment channels.

The name is a reference to a former Major League Baseball player named Shoeless Joe Jackson.

It is not to be confused with the Shoeless Joe's sports bars chain fronted by Victor Ubogu in London.

Stores
The original location was on Eglinton Avenue in Toronto, Ontario as a local community sports bar. Investor Fred Lopreiato purchased it within several years, and the first franchised location opened in 1991. From 2011 until 2014, the franchise changed its image from that of a local sports bar to a "premium sports grill aesthetic." By 2014, there were over 34 locations in Ontario in locations such as Courtney Park, Mississauga, with most franchised.

Shoeless Joe's Sports Grill reopened after renovation and a change in ownership on December 12, 2016, located in the Whitby Entertainment Centrum in Whitby. Also in July 2016, it was reported that the developer Stonebridge was planning to open a Shoeless Joe's restaurant in Peterborough, Canada. The two former restaurants in the city had closed, with a new building 4,560-square-foot large planned.

In July 2016, the first location of the chain was opened outside Ontario, in Stonebridge, Saskatoon, Saskatchewan.

See also
List of Canadian restaurant chains

References

External links
Shoeless Joe's

Restaurants established in 1985
Regional restaurant chains in Canada
Sports-themed restaurants
Restaurant chains in Canada
1985 establishments in Ontario